Melting Away  (Names Ba-Geshem) is a 2012 Israeli drama film written by Billy Ben-Moshe and directed by Doron Eran, starring Hen Yanni in the lead role. This is the first Israeli feature film deals with parents coping with their transgender child.

Production
The idea for the movie was conceived after the 2009 Tel Aviv gay centre shooting.  Doron Eran and Billy Ben-Moshe watched TV and heard that parents refused to visit their  injured kids at the hospital because they were afraid that their friends and relatives would know that their son is homosexual or their daughter is lesbian.  The director  Doron Eran made auditions for 120 actors until he found Hen Yanni, the actress he chooses for the lead role.

Plot
Shlomo Shapira discovers one day that his teenage son Asaf  likes to wear women's clothes. With the silent consent of his wife Galia, he decides to teach his son a lesson. On a rainy night Asaf returns to his parents' home after a party but they refuse to open the door, even though he cries. Shlomo tell Galia that after Asaf discovers the hard world outside he will come back home and will forget all of this nonsense, but he was wrong.
Four years later, Shlomo is dying from cancer and Galia turns to Eytan, a private investigator to find her son and tell him about his father. Eytan finds Asaf in a Tel-Aviv gay night club. It turns out that Asaf transitioned and has become a beautiful singer named Anna.
On the next day a woman named Anna came to the hospital where Shlomo is hospitalized, saying she is a private nurse sent from the insurance company. Anna visits her father day after day and they gradually get to know each other. She succeeds in conquering Shlomo's heart with her charming personality. At the same time, Galia visits her daughter Anna a few times and gradually accepts her.

Prizes
	Special award for breakthrough performance to Hen Yanni for her role in "Melting Away"- Tel Aviv International LGBT Film Festival
	Audience Award at the Boston Jewish Film Festival, 2012
	Audience Award for Best Narrative Feature at the ImageOut: Rochester LGBT Film and Video Festival, October 2012
	Audience Award at the Shalom Europa IFF, France 2012
	Festival Award at the Au fil(m) du temps- IMAJ Israeli Film Festival, Belgium 2011 
 Hen Yanni was nominated to Ophir Award for best actress

Cast
 Hen Yanni – Asaf Shapira / Anna
 Ami Weinberg – Shlomo Shapira
 Limor Goldstein – Galia Shapira
 Oded Leopold –Itzik, Anna's uncle and Shlomo's young brother
 Eyal Rozales –Eytan,  the private investigator
 Yonatan Barak – Gingi, the private investigator assistant 		
 Shay Kadimi – Shimi, Anna's childhood friend, having difficulties Coming out of the closet in front of his mother.; Moty's boyfriend
 Hannan Suissa – Moty, Anna's childhood friend, Shimi's boyfriend
 Shosha Goren – Sarah, Shimi's mother, she function as a mother to the three boys
 Arnon Zadok – Shlomo Shapira business partner

See also
 Culture of Israel
 Cinema of Israel

References

External links
 
 Melting Away in Israelifilmcenter.org
  from the movie
 

Israeli LGBT-related films
Films about trans women
2012 drama films
2012 LGBT-related films
2012 films
2010s Hebrew-language films
Films about LGBT and Judaism
Israeli drama films
LGBT-related drama films